Till I Come Back to You is a 1918 American silent drama film directed by Cecil B. DeMille. This film is preserved in the George Eastman House Motion Picture Collection.

Plot
As described in a film magazine, Yvonne (Vidor), the wife of German officer Karl Von Drutz (von Seyffertitz), is left in their Belgian home at the start of World War I. King Albert (Hall) stops at the house during his retreat where he finds little Jacques (Stone) playing soldier. The king tells him to be brave and wait "till I come back to you." America enters the war and Capt. Jefferson Strong (Washburn) is detailed to destroy the German storehouse containing their liquid fire supply. He pretends to be an escaped German soldier and hides in Yvonne's cottage, learns of the supplies, and directs the tunneling under the house. Von Drutz returns, finds Strong telephoning, and a terrific struggle ensues. Little Jacques takes a score of orphans from a nearby asylum and they escape through the tunnel. Strong saves the lives of the children but is arrested for disobedience, tried, and court martialed. Through the influence of King Albert he is saved from being shot. Yvonne, whose husband has been killed, finds consolation in Strong's love.

Cast
 Bryant Washburn as Capt. Jefferson Strong
 Florence Vidor as Yvonne
 Gustav von Seyffertitz as Karl Von Drutz (as G. Butler Clonbough)
 Winter Hall as King Albert
 George Stone as Jacques
 Julia Faye as Susette
 Lillian Leighton as Margot
 Clarence Geldart as U.S. colonel
 Mae Giraci as Rosa
 C. Renfeld as Rosa's father
 William Irving as Stroheim
 Frank Butterworth as Hans
 Monte Blue as American doughboy

References

External links

Synopsis at allmovie.com

1918 films
Films directed by Cecil B. DeMille
1918 drama films
American silent feature films
American black-and-white films
Silent American drama films
1910s American films